The 187th Pennsylvania House of Representatives District is located in Southeast Pennsylvania and has been represented since 2023 by Ryan Mackenzie.

District profile
The 187th Pennsylvania House of Representatives District is located in Lehigh County and includes the following areas:

 Alburtis
 Macungie
 Heidelberg Township
 Lower Macungie Township
 Lynn Township
 Upper Macungie Township (PART, District 03, 07, and 08)
 Washington Township
 Weisenberg Township

Representatives

Recent election results

References

External links
District map from the United States Census Bureau
Pennsylvania House Legislative District Maps from the Pennsylvania Redistricting Commission.  
Population Data for District 187 from the Pennsylvania Redistricting Commission.

Government of Berks County, Pennsylvania
Government of Lehigh County, Pennsylvania
187